Sandy Cove is a community of the Halifax Regional Municipality in the Canadian province of Nova Scotia on the Chebucto Peninsula.

Climate

References

 Explore HRM
Sandy Cove on Destination Nova Scotia

Communities in Halifax, Nova Scotia
General Service Areas in Nova Scotia